The Gastre Fault Zone (GFZ) is a  NW-SE striking dextral Jurassic Gastre Fault System (cf. Rapela & Pankhurst, 1992) in Central Patagonia, Argentina.

From a tentative correlation of the fault zone with the similarly NW-SE trend, it was termed ‘Gastre Fault Zone’ or ‘Gastre-Purén Fault Zone’ to the Lanalhue Fault Zone in Chile by early works. However, in later works  it is shown that this correlation is incorrect. Since the lake ‘Lago Lanalhue’, is located on the fault trace and shows a NW-SE-elongated shape, ‘Lanalhue Fault Zone (LFZ)’ stands as appropriate name for the here discussed fault zone.
The Mocha-Villarrica Fault Zone is the NW-SE trending fault responsible for the alignment of Villarrica, Quetrupillán and Lanín volcanoes.

References

Geology of Neuquén Province
Geology of Araucanía Region
Geology of Los Ríos Region
Geology of Río Negro Province
Seismic faults of Argentina
Seismic faults of Chile